The Juvencus Manuscript (Cambridge, Cambridge University Library, MS Ff. 4.42) is one of the main surviving sources of Old Welsh. Unlike much Old Welsh, which is attested in manuscripts from later periods and in partially updated form, the Welsh material in the Juvencus Manuscript was written in the Old Welsh period itself; the manuscript provides the first attestation of many Welsh words.

Around the second half of the ninth century, someone copied two Old Welsh poems into the margins: a nine-stanza englyn poem on the wonders of God's creation (generally known as the 'Juvencus nine'), and, on folios 25-26, a three-stanza poem which seems to represent a warrior lamenting his misfortunes (known as the 'Juvencus three'). These are the earliest surviving englynion. The parts of the manuscript containing the 'Juvencus three' were cut out of the manuscript and stolen in the early eighteenth century by the antiquary Edward Lhuyd (1660-1709), but were found after his death and returned to the manuscript.

Provenance

The manuscript was originally produced somewhere in Wales as a text of the Latin poem Evangeliorum Libri by Juvencus. This text was produced by more than ten different scribes, working around 900. One had the Old Irish name Nuadu. Another included his name as a cryptogram in Greek letters: the Welsh name Cemelliauc (modern Welsh Cyfeilliog), who could have been the same person as the Bishop Cameleac whom the Anglo-Saxon Chronicle describes as being captured by Vikings in the see in Ergyng in 914. To this text the scribes added a large body of glosses in Latin and Old Welsh, along with a few in Old Irish, showing that the manuscript was produced in a milieu influenced by both Welsh and Irish scholarship.

The 'Juvencus Three'

As edited and translated by Jenny Rowland, the text reads:

In Rowland's estimation,
several points of the language remain unclear but enough is intelligible thanks to Ifor Williams's work to give a view of a short saga poem in fully Old Welsh guise. The poem is not long enough to invite comparison with any extant tale or cycle, but the situation clearly demands a story background. As in Canu Llywarch and Canu Heledd the speaker appears to be a 'last survivor', but a more active one, like the narrator of "The Wanderer". Instead of a party of his equals he is reduced to the company of a mercenary or freedman and thus takes no pleasure in the evening drinking. The skilful use of repetition builds a picture of the narrator's condition and emotional state, although only lightly ornamented englynion are used.

The 'Juvencus Nine'

As edited in the nineteenth century by William Forbes Skene and as translated in 1932 by Ifor Williams, the text reads:

Editions and translations

The main edition is The Cambridge Juvencus manuscript glossed in Latin, Old Welsh, and Old Irish: text and commentary, ed. by Helen McKee (Aberystwyth: CMCS Publications, 2000). The manuscript is available in digital facsimile at http://cudl.lib.cam.ac.uk/view/MS-FF-00004-00042, though there is an earlier printed facsimile too. The poetry has been edited previously:

 Ifor Williams, 'Tri Englyn y Juvencus', Bulletin of the Board of Celtic Studies, 6 (1933), 101-10 (edition of the three-stanza englyn-poem)
 Ifor Williams, 'Naw Englyn y Juvencus', Bulletin of the Board of Celtic Studies, 6 (1933), 205-24 (edition of the nine-stanza englyn-poem)
 The Beginnings of Welsh Poetry, ed. by R. Bromwich (Cardiff, 1972), pp. 89ff (editions and English translations of both the three- and the nine-stanza englynion)
 Marged Haycock, Blodeugerdd Barddas o Ganu Crefyddol Cynnar (Llandybïe, 1994), pp. 3–29

References

 
Welsh-language literature
Welsh literature
Welsh poetry